The Monte Civrari is  a mountain of the Graian Alps, with an elevation of 2,302 m.

Etymology 
The name Civrari means goats’ mountain (from ciavra, the Piedmontese word for goat). There is strong evidence that the area was in the past widely exploited for goat grazing.

Geography 

The Civrari is not an isolated peak but a small massif. Its main summit is named Punta Imperatoria; in the massif are also located Torretta del Prete (2.264 m), Punta della Croce (2.236 m), Monte Rognoso (1.952 m) and, in a wider sense, also the Punte di Costafiorita and Punta Sourela (1.777 m). 
On the summit of Punta Imperatoria stands a trigpoint of the IGM named Monte Civrari (code 055037).

Punta Imperatoria is located slightly N of the ridge dividing Val Susa from Val di Viù, and stands on the border between the comunes of Viù and Lemie (both in the Metropolitan City of Turin).

SOIUSA classification 
According to the SOIUSA (International Standardized Mountain Subdivision of the Alps) the mountain can be classified in the following way:
 main part = Western Alps
 major sector = North Western Alps
 section = Graian Alps
 subsection = Southern  Graian Alps
 supergroup = catena Rocciamelone-Charbonel
 group = gruppo del Rocciamelone
 subgroup = cresta Lunella-Arpone
 code = I/B-7.I-A.2.b

Access to the summit
The easiest route for the summit is a footpath starting from Niquidetto or from the Colle del Colombardo, a mountain pass which connects Viù and Condove and can be reached with 4wd vehicles.

Maps
 Italian official cartography (Istituto Geografico Militare - IGM); on-line version: www.pcn.minambiente.it
 I.G.C. (Istituto Geografico Centrale): Carta dei sentieri e dei rifugi  1:50.000 scale n.2 Valli di Lanzo e Moncenisio, and 1:25.000 scale n.110 Basse valli di Lanzo

Bibliography 
 Alpi Graie meridionali, Giulio Berutto e Lino Fornelli,  Guida dei Monti d'Italia; Club Alpino Italiano, 1980

Notes

Image gallery

External links 
 Monte Civrari: 360° panoramic image from the summit on  pano.ica-net.it
  Monte Civrari-Punta Imperatoria, Italy on peakbagger.com

See also

Mountains of Piedmont
Mountains of the Graian Alps
Civrari